The Dynamic Superiors is the debut album for The Dynamic Superiors on Motown Records.  Released in 1975, it contains the hits "Shoe Shoe Shine" and "Leave It Alone". After a 35-year wait, in 2010,  this album was finally released on CD in a 2-for-1 set with The Superiors'  second Motown album, Pure Pleasure, not by Motown, but by Universal's Soul Music.com imprint.  Selected Tracks for the group's 2 album CD release.
The album was arranged by Leon Pendarvis, Arthur Jenkins, Paul Riser and Richard Tee. It was written and produced by the husband-and-wife team of Nick Ashford and Valerie Simpson with Dick Ellescas credited for the cover illustration.

Track listing
All tracks composed by Nick Ashford and Valerie Simpson; except where indicated
 "Shoe Shoe Shine"
 "Soon"
 "Leave It Alone"
 "Don't Send Nobody Else"
 "Romeo"
 "Star of my Life"
 "Cry When You Want To"
 "I Got Away" (Raymond Simpson)
 "One-Nighter"

References

1975 debut albums
Dynamic Superiors albums
Albums arranged by Paul Riser
Albums produced by Ashford & Simpson
Motown albums